John Ribat  (born 9 February 1957) is a Papua New Guinean prelate of the Roman Catholic Church and a cardinal since 2016. He has been Archbishop of Port Moresby since 2008.

Biography

Ribat was born in Volavolo, Papua New Guinea. He professed as a member of the Missionaries of the Sacred Heart of Jesus in February 1979. He was ordained a priest on 1 December 1985.

He worked as a parish priest, continued his studies in Manila, and served as master of novices for the Missionaries in Suva, Fiji.

On 30 October 2000, Pope John Paul II named him auxiliary bishop of Bereina and titular bishop of Macriana Minor. He was consecrated bishop on 11 February 2001 and named Bishop of Bereina on 12 February 2002. Pope Benedict XVI named him Coadjutor Archbishop of Port Moresby on 16 April 2007 and he succeeded to that office on 26 March 2008.

He was conferred a knighthood on 12 June 2016 in the Queen's Birthday Honours list.

On 9 October 2016, Pope Francis announced that he planned to raise Ribat to the rank of cardinal at a consistory scheduled for 19 November 2016. He was made a Cardinal Priest on that day and assigned to the titular church of San Giovanni Battista de Rossi. He is the first cardinal from his country.

Francis made him a member of the Dicastery for Promoting Integral Human Development on 23 December 2017.

References

External links

 
 

1957 births
Living people
Knights Commander of the Order of the British Empire
People from East New Britain Province
21st-century Roman Catholic archbishops in Papua New Guinea
Cardinals created by Pope Francis
Missionaries of the Sacred Heart
Papua New Guinean cardinals
Papua New Guinean knights
Roman Catholic archbishops of Port Moresby
Roman Catholic bishops of Bereina
Papua New Guinean Roman Catholic archbishops